A RoadRailer is a trailer or semi-trailer that can be hauled on roads by a tractor unit and then by way of a fifth wheel coupling, operate in a unit train on railway lines. The RoadRailer system allows trailers to be pulled by locomotives without the use of flatcars, instead attaching trailers directly to bogies.

Overview

The advantage of using roadrailers is their ability to be used directly behind other freight (or even passenger) equipment without the use of trailer flatcars.

Roadrailers first appeared on American railroads in the 1950s. The trailers were built with integrated railroad wheelsets that could be lowered into position when the trailer was pulled behind a train. More modern roadrailers do not include integrated railroad wheels, but ride on regular trucks that do double-duty, serving as articulation points between multiple trailers in a train. Each regular truck is equipped with one fifth wheel at one end and a connector plate at the other end. The connector plate slides into a female receptacle on the rear of the trailer in front and is secured with a steel pin. At the head of a Road Railer train there is an adaptor truck equipped with one fifth wheel and one regular AAR Type "E" or Type "F" automatic coupler. Each semi-trailer has one king pin at each end. Because the truck (bogie) is significantly lighter than a rail flatcar or well-car, roadrailer freight trains are much lighter and therefore are more energy efficient than traditional intermodal trains.

RoadRailers were built by the Bi-Modal Corporations in the early 1980s located in West Chester, Pennsylvania. The trailers were built by the Budd Company locally with the integration of the wheelsets and railroad braking system done at the nearby Bi-Modal factory. This was a modern up-date of Chesapeake & Ohio Railway's RoadRailers introduced in 1955. The railroad wheelsets attached to the aft portion of the trailer were lowered pneumatically by activating a control valve on the left rear of the trailer. To transfer from highway mode to rail mode, the trailer driver would position the trailer over tracks laid into a paved rail yard. First the operator would activate the valve to exhaust air from the airbags that supported the trailer in the highway mode. In the fully lowered or squat position, hooks holding the railwheel set above the road surface released. Then the operator would move the valve to inflate the two airbags used for rail mode. These air bags were similar to those used in passenger rail cars at the time. After being fully transferred, the trailer would be fully level and ready for connection to the next trailer in the train. A similar system was trialed in the UK, though the concept proved unsuccessful, partly due to the reduction in load volume required to fit inside the UK's smaller loading gauge, and also due to objections by the powerful rail and road transport unions.

Throughout the early 1980s various railroads experimented with the RoadRailer concept to determine if the equipment would be sufficiently durable to endure railroad use. The positive attributes of the RoadRailer were its exceptionally smooth ride, light weight and low capital costs to establish a rail yard. Since no flatcars were involved, no crane systems were needed to transfer the trailers between modes. During one demonstration test a train of RoadRailers was broken down in the middle of an industrial street in Portland, Oregon which happened to have track in the street, demonstrating the flexibility of the system. Another note was that a RoadRailer train did not have a caboose, which at the time was still required for freight trains. A box was designed with a yellow strobe light, and equipment for monitoring air pressure through the brake line was designed to be installed in the unused coupler of the last car. Later, as cabooses were phased out, railroads moved to their current use of an end-of-train device to mark the end of the train.

In 1982, Conrail operated a route between Buffalo, Rochester and Highbridge in New York State, called the Empire State Xpress, operated by Bi-Modal subsidiary Road-Rail Transportation Company. The concept was to offer customers rapid freight service that would be competitive with traditional over-the-road service. Dedicated trains left Buffalo and Highbridge each evening, arriving early the next morning. The line was eventually shut down after never establishing enough key customers to utilize the service. In 1992, Amtrak began a trial of RailRoaders to carry mail attached to passenger trains. It was deemed unsuccessful.

In 1991, the RoadRailer concept was purchased by Wabash National Corporation.

The primary reason that the original RoadRailer concept was not viable was the weight penalty imposed on the trailers because of the attached railroad wheelset. This was resolved in later designs which removed the integrated wheelset by having a dedicated rail bogie assembly that stayed in the rail yard, as seen today. 

Triple Crown, a subsidiary of Norfolk Southern Railway, remains a user of RoadRailer transportation as of 2022.

Users

Roadrailers have been used in:
 United States and still are.
 British Rail introduced RoadRailers on the East Coast Main Line between London, Newcastle and Edinburgh in 1964
 Australian National commenced operating a trial RoadRailer service on the Adelaide to Alice Springs line in August 1990. However a permanent service did not begin until 1993 with the introduction of an Adelaide to Perth service in a joint venture with National Rail under the Trailerail brand. Contractual difficulties saw the service cease until resuming in November 1994. It was extended to Melbourne in November 1995.
 Austria
 Brazil
 Canada on Canadian National, previously run on Canadian Pacific
 New Zealand experimental and discontinued
 Indian Railways introduced in October 2018 between Tamil Nadu and Palwal

See also

 Containerization
 Intermodal container
 Modalohr
 Nicky Line – Where some test of a road-railer bus were carried out in the 1930s
 Piggyback (transportation)
 Road-rail vehicle
 Rolling highway

References

Bibliography

External links

A view of the tailgate end of an Amtrak Mark V RoadRailer; photographed in Winslow, Arizona in March, 1999

Freight rolling stock
Intermodal containers
Rail and road vehicle